is a private university in Chūō-ku, Kobe, Hyōgo, Japan. The campuses are located in central part of Kobe.

History 
1999 - Founded as a women's college with a department (Department of Environment and Culture, Faculty of Humanities).
2002 - It became coeducational.
2006 - Department of Urban Exchanges was established.
2008 - Faculty of Humanities was changed its name to Faculty of Contemporary Social Studies.
2013 - Department of General Social Studies was established in succession to Department of Environment and Culture, and Department of Urban Exchanges.
2015 - Department of Tourism was established in succession to School of Tourism, Kobe Shukugawa Gakuin University.

Organization

Faculty (Undergraduate Programs) 
Faculty of Contemporary Social Studies
Department of Tourism
Global Communication
Tourism and Culture
Tourism Business
Department of General Social Studies
Media Sociology
Psychology
Economics and Management Sciences
Environmental Studies
Interior Architecture

External links

 Official website 

Educational institutions established in 1999
Private universities and colleges in Japan
Universities and colleges in Hyōgo Prefecture
1999 establishments in Japan